Lake Dalecarlia is a census-designated place (CDP) in Lake County, Indiana, United States. The population was 1,355 at the 2010 census. The name comes from the English name of the Dalarna region of Sweden. The community is centered on the lake of the same name, which was completed in the 1920s.

Geography
The Lake Dalecarlia community is located in southern Lake County at  (41.331727, -87.403852), surrounding a lake of the same name. The community is at the northern end of Cedar Creek Township and is bordered to the north by the town of Cedar Lake.

The community's namesake lake is a reservoir on Cedar Creek, a south-flowing tributary of the Kankakee River and thus part of the Illinois River watershed.

Demographics

At the 2000 census, there were 1,285 people, 506 households and 363 families residing in the CDP. The racial make-up of the CDP was 98.21% White, 0.39% African American, 0.39% Native American, 0.08% Asian, 0.16% from other races and 0.78% from two or more races. Hispanic or Latino of any race were 2.33% of the population.

There were 506 households, of which 28.9% had children under the age of 18 living with them, 62.6% were married couples living together, 5.9% had a female householder with no husband present and 28.1% were non-families. 23.3% of all households were made up of individuals, and 8.7% had someone living alone who was 65 years of age or older. The average household size was 2.54 and the average family size was 3.02.

22.8% of the population were under the age of 18, 7.9% from 18 to 24, 27.8% from 25 to 44, 28.5% from 45 to 64 and 13.0% were 65 years of age or older. The median age was 39 years. For every 100 females, there were 100.2 males. For every 100 females age 18 and over, there were 96.8 males.

The median household income was $52,454 and the median family income was $54,297. Males had a median income of $44,659 and females $21,250. The per capita income was $25,068. About 1.9% of families and 4.1% of the population were below the poverty line, including 5.0% of those under age 18 and 6.1% of those age 65 or over.

References

Census-designated places in Lake County, Indiana
Census-designated places in Indiana